Kim Yoo-jung (born September 22, 1999) is a South Korean actress. She debuted as a model for a confectionery brand at the age of four. After her acting debut in 2003, she became one of the most in-demand child actresses in Korea. She gained public attention for starring in television series Dong Yi (2010),  Moon Embracing the Sun (2012), May Queen (2012), Golden Rainbow (2013), Secret Door (2014) and Angry Mom (2015). She also starred in the films Commitment (2013), Thread of Lies (2014), and Circle of Atonement (2015). She hosted music show Inkigayo from November 2014 to April 2016.

She took on her first leading role in historical romance drama Love in the Moonlight (2016) and starred in romantic comedy film Because I Love You (2017), television drama Clean with Passion for Now (2018), Backstreet Rookie (2020), mystery thriller film The 8th Night (2021), historical fantasy romance drama Lovers of the Red Sky (2021), and teen romance film 20th Century Girl (2022).

Kim has been nicknamed "Nation's Little Sister" after playing various child roles and "Sageuk fairy" after taking roles in several acclaimed historical dramas in her career. She also gained the nicknames "Nation's First Love" and "Global First Love" following her well-loved performance in 20th Century Girl.<ref>{{cite web|url=https://entertain.naver.com/read?oid=052&aid=0001806302|author=Kang Nae-ri|title=[Y터뷰] '20세기 소녀' 김유정, '국민 여동생'의 '국민 첫사랑' 도전기|trans-title=[Y Interview] '20th Century Girl' Kim Yoo-jung, 'National Sisters 'National First Love' challenge|publisher=YTN|via=Naver|date=October 27, 2022|access-date=October 27, 2022|language=ko}}</ref> In 2017, she ranked 8th on Forbes Korea Power Celebrity list, the youngest to be included in the Top 10 at the age of 17.

Early life and education
Kim was born in Seongdong District, Seoul, South Korea on September 22, 1999 as the youngest of three siblings. Her older sister, Kim Yeon-jung, debuted as an actress in 2017.

Kim attended Goyang High School of Arts and graduated in January 2018. Kim deferred taking the national College Scholastic Ability Test in 2017, and instead decided to focus on her acting career.

Career
2003–2011: Beginnings as a child actress

After Kim's acting debut when she was 4, she quickly became one of the most in-demand child actresses in Korea. By the time she was a fifth grader, Kim had already appeared in 13 TV dramas and 15 movies.

In 2008, she received her first acting award as "Best Child Actress" for action-adventure series Iljimae and historical drama Painter of the Wind. This was followed by acclaimed performances in Dong Yi (2010) and Flames of Desire (2010). Grudge: The Revolt of Gumiho (2010) marked Kim's first major role that wasn't the childhood counterpart of the female protagonist.

2012–2014: Rising popularity
She rose to popularity in 2012 when she starred in the fantasy-period drama Moon Embracing the Sun, which reunited Kim with Grudge: The Revolt of Gumiho costar Lee Tae-ri and Iljimae costar Yeo Jin-goo. Moon surpassed 40% ratings and gained "national drama" status. For her good portrayal of the young protagonist, she was nominated for the Best New Actress in the 48th Baeksang Arts Awards and she won Best Young Actress Award in the 1st K-Drama Star Awards and 2012 MBC Drama Awards. She followed this with a well-received turn in May Queen (2012) and a supporting role in the 2013 film Commitment, and family drama Golden Rainbow (2013).

In 2014, Kim's performance as a teenage bully in Thread of Lies drew critical acclaim and she was nominated for the Best New Actress in Blue Dragon Film Awards. She next played a traditional funeral singer (or "gok-bi") in the single-episode Drama Special anthology, and was cast in the horror mystery Room 731, an English-language graduate thesis film by USC filmmaker Kim Young-min. This was followed by a starring role in the period drama Secret Door. Kim also began hosting music show Inkigayo in November 2014 and left the show in April 2016.

2015–2022: Transition to lead roles

In 2015, she starred in the television series Angry Mom which tackled bullying and school violence. The same year, she reprised her role as a cat-turned-woman in Love Cells, a two-season web series adapted from the webtoon of the same title and played a murderer's daughter in the thriller film Circle of Atonement.

In August 2016, Kim starred in her first adult leading role in the youth historical drama Love in the Moonlight as Hong Ra-on - a girl who was raised as a boy and eventually became a eunuch of Crown Prince of Joseon, played by Park Bo-gum. A domestic hit, Moonlight achieved peak audience rating of 23.3% and its popularity was referred to as "Moonlight Syndrome". Kim won "Excellence Award, Actress in a Mid-length Drama" for portraying Moonlight cross-dressing heroine at the 30th KBS Drama Awards.

In 2017, she starred with Cha Tae-hyun in the romantic-comedy film Because I Love You. Kim also had her first overseas fan meeting tour with Taipei, Taiwan as the first stop, at ATT Show Box on February 4, 2017.

In 2018, Kim starred in the romantic-comedy drama Clean with Passion for Now, based on the webtoon of the same name. She played an employee at a cleaning company who doesn't care about dirtiness.

In 2020, Kim was cast in the romantic-comedy drama, Backstreet Rookie, alongside Ji Chang-wook, based on a webtoon of the same name and played the role of a former high school troublemaker who becomes a part-time employee at a convenience store. The actress is said to be attending action school in order to perform her own stunts and the production staff stated, "Kim Yoo-jung has been working hard on fight scenes and wire action for her role as Jung Saet-byul. Please anticipate the unique transformation that Kim Yoo-jung will undergo."

During the 2020 SBS Drama Awards held on December 31, 2020, Kim was chosen to be the main host together with Shin Dong-yup. At the same event, Kim was awarded Excellence Award, Actress in a Miniseries Fantasy/Romance Drama for her great portrayal of her role as Jung Saet-byul in the series Backstreet Rookie.

In December 2020, Kim was confirmed to be the female lead role in the historical-fantasy drama Lovers of the Red Sky adapted from the novel written by Jung Eun-gwol. The drama premiered in August 2021 on SBS TV and Kim played the titular role of Hong Chun-gi, the Joseon dynasty's only female painter, alongside Ahn Hyo-seop as Ha Ram, a blind astrologer. The series reunited Kim with director Jang Tae-yoo after 13 years since Painter of the Wind (2008) where Kim played the childhood counterpart of the protagonist.

In 2021, Kim appeared in the mystery thriller Netflix film The 8th Night in the role of an enigmatic psychic. In December 2021, she made a cameo appearance in the final episode of  Coupang Play's television series One Ordinary Day. At the end of 2021, Kim hosted 2021 SBS Drama Awards with Shin Dong-yup for 2nd year in row, receiving Top Excellence Award, Actress in a Miniseries Genre/Fantasy Drama and winning Best Couple Award with Ahn Hyo-seop for the drama Lovers of the Red Sky at the same event.

In 2022, Kim reunited with the director and cast members of Love in the Moonlight in the TVING travel entertainment program Young Actors' Retreat. The same year, she appeared in the Netflix film 20th Century Girl playing the title role as 17-year-old Na Bo-ra in 1999.

2023: Stage debut

Kim made her theatrical stage debut in January 2023, taking part in Kim Dong-yeon's play Shakespeare in Love, adapted from the 1998 film of the same name. She played the role of Viola de Lesseps, the daughter of a wealthy merchant, who disguises herself as a man named Thomas Kent to become a theater actress, which was taboo for women at the time. The play received favorable reviews and Kim's performance was praised by the critics and the audience.

Personal life
In February 2018, it was revealed that Kim was diagnosed with dysfunctions of the thyroid gland and would take a break from acting.

 Philanthropy 
On August 26, 2010, Kim joined the "Kiss of Love" campaign to selling products produced by Seoul Social Welfare Community Chest of Korea using celebrities lip marks, autographs, and caricatures for support the self-reliance and child education of low-income families. In December 2010, Kim Yoo-jung and other 33 Sidus HQ's actors participated to show the beauty of Korea under the theme of Hanbok in a Love Sharing Hanbok Calendar event; the proceeds from sales were donated to Korea Compassion.

On February 2, 2012, Kim and many other actors, opinion leaders, and models took part in the exhibition photography held by Kolon Sport for its 2012 S/S Collection while the modeling fee was decided to be used as a donation, to serve neighbors in need. On April 20, Kim gave out t-shirts designed by popular designer Kathleen Kye to participated on smart donation culture held by Samsung Electronics while releasing its smart TV on 'Insight Exhibition' to support Hanbit School for the Blind's students to continue to show their talents, meanwhile the donated clothes were delivered to neighbors in need. On May 5, Kim and Yeo Jin-goo did good deeds and made a voice donation in the documentary narration of 'New Life to Children'—Sookhyun's Picture Diary, a live broadcast on MBC's special program for children with rare incurable diseases, which airs on the Children's Day.

Kim auctioned an iPhone case during a charity auction event held by Gyeonggi Province and Daum's portal site titled Infinite Care Campaign Auction for Neighborhood Love from January 9 to 16, 2013. Proceeds from the auction event are used for needy neighbors in Gyeonggi Province. On November 23, Kim's attractive pictorials was revealed with the aim of helping around her through steady volunteer work by participated in the fashion magazine Elle's signature charity project Share Happiness. It is a special charity collaboration project consisting of Elle's paper donations, stars' photo talent donations, and brand's relief fund. The donations collected under the name of Share Happiness will be donated in full to help women and children in need in the society.

On August 21, 2014, Kim participated in the Ice Bucket Challenge, a fundraising campaign underway by US ALS Association to develop treatments for "ALS", which is known as Lou Gehrig's disease, and to help patients. Regardless of took an ice water shower, she also made donation to the ALS Association. On October 8, Kim and other top stars representing South Korea made talent donation by recording in the production of campaign song "Talk About Love" to encourage citizens to participate and joined forces to rescue climate refugees in Tanzania and Malawi, Africa, who are dying due to the effects of climate change. This project is jointly planned and supervised by Environment TV, an international relief organization.

On June 1, 2015, it has been confirmed that Kim expressed her intention to donate all of her narration fees to Samhyewon, a Child Welfare Center as she is the voice of Jun-hee for MBC's Human Documentary Love "Jin-sil Eomma II - Hwan-hee and Jun-hee's Adolescence", while in 2014 she also made a precious relationship by donating snacks. In December 2015, actors Lee Ki-woo, Hong Jong-hyun and Kim have stepped forward to help their neighbors have a warm winter. The three donated 5,600 briquettes as well as delivering briquettes directly to Baeksa Village in Junggyebon-dong, Nowon-gu. On June 7, 2018, Kim was selected for the Ice Bucket Challenge, but donated ₩2,000,000 to the Ice Bucket Challenge fund and ₩100,000 won to the construction fund of Lou Gehrig Care Hospital instead of taking an ice water shower for health (hypothyroidism) reasons. Kim tried to convey her true feelings in a handwritten letter, and exerted a good influence to pay a lot of attention after the construction of the Lou Gehrig Care Hospital.

In April 2019, Kim made donations to the association to help residents in the affected areas caused by the first-ever large forest fire in Gangwon Province. On October 13, Kim made donations at '2019 Pink Run' Seoul Competition – a running festival to improve awareness of breast cancer. The full participation fee was donated to the Korea Breast Health Foundation, to be used to support breast cancer patients' surgery and breast cancer screening. On October 27, ChildFund Korea revealed that Kim has become the 229th patron of the Green Noble Club, which is composed of individuals who have donated a large sum of at least ₩100,000,000 (approximately $88,511). Kim, who has become the youngest member to have joined the club, continued to quietly make donations under a different name since her debut, has donated money to help low-income children in need due to COVID-19, and the remainder was used to fund sick children's medical expenses.

On October 1, 2021, Kim donated 30 million won to support children at risk of crime victims through the Green Umbrella Children's Foundation. This donation was made on the occasion of Kim's birthday. It is a meaningful donation to repay the hearts of fans who always send love and support. The donation will be used as an emergency subsidy for living expenses, medical expenses and housing expenses so that children at risk of crime victims can recover their health and boast healthy and brightness.

Filmography

Discography

Ambassadorship

Endorsements
After making her debut in an advertisement for Crown Confectionery in 2003, Kim appeared in number of commercials for variety of brands as a child actress. In 2012, following her appearance in Moon Embracing the Sun, she became an advertising model for Domino's Pizza with Kim Soo-hyun, appeared in a washing machine advertisement for Samsung Electronics with Han Ga-in, became the face of a dairy product by Seoul Milk with Yeo Jin-goo and featured in a video game commercial for Nintendo 3DS  with Kim So-hyun.

In 2017, Kim became the brand model for South Korean sportswear manufacture FILA and promoted the brand till 2022. In 2018, she became a brand model for cosmetics brand Laneige.  In 2021, she was selected as an advertising model for Alcon contact lenses and Torretta – a water/ion supplement drink by Coca-Cola. In January 2022, Kim featured in 7-minute-long commercial video named Dark Farm'' – an advertising video for Laneige's Radian-C Cream, which recorded 1.45 million views within 10 days of its release. The same year, she became an advertising model for Hana Bank.

Awards and nominations

Listicles

References

External links

  
 
 
 

21st-century South Korean actresses
South Korean television personalities
South Korean film actresses
People from Seoul
South Korean television actresses
South Korean child actresses
South Korean stage actresses
South Korean web series actresses
1999 births
Living people